Encore was Bobby Vinton's thirtieth studio album, released in 1980. "Make Believe It's Your First Time" and "Let Me Love You Goodbye" are two singles from the album. Covers include "He" and "To All the Girls I've Loved Before".

Track listing
Side 1

Side 2

Personnel
 Bobby Vinton - primary artist, producer
 Ron Malo - recording engineer
 Carol Jolin - female vocals

Charts

References

1980 albums
Bobby Vinton albums